The National Civil Service Agency (BKN) is a non-ministry government body in Indonesia for civil servant management. The equivalent counterpart are Civil Service in United Kingdom.

History
During Indonesian National Revolution, the civil service was divided into Republic of Indonesia government and Dutch East Indies government. The Indonesian government formed Office of Civil Servant Affairs (KUP) with Government Regulation 11/1948 on 30 May 1948 which located at Yogyakarta. The Dutch East Indies government formed General Staff Service (DAPZ, DUUP), by the Decree of the Governor General of the Dutch East Indies Number 13 dated June 9, 1948, headed by Mr. J.W. Van Hoogstraken and located in Jakarta. After dissolution of United States of Indonesia on 15 August 1950, government saw that the need for centralization in Jakarta, thus merged DUUP into KUP and relocated to Jakarta. In 1972, KUP was transformed into National Civil Service Administration Agency (BAKN). Later, BAKN transformed into National Civil Service Agency (BKN).

In October 2021, National Civil Service Agency detected fraud on Civil Servant Selection. For this reason, NCSA had made breakthrough innovations with face recording technology from registration to the implementation of the exam. Later, NCSA disqualified 225 candidates due to fraud.

Responsibility and function
NCSA has the task of carrying out government duties in the field of state personnel management in accordance with the provisions of the legislation.
In carrying out its duties, NCSA carries out the following functions:
 preparation and determination of technical policies in the field of personnel management;
 implementation of procurement, transfer, dismissal and retirement, as well as the legal status and position of civil servants;
 administration of pensions, state officials and former state officials;
 implementation of the personnel management information system;
 implementation of supervision and control of the implementation of personnel management;
 implementation of potential mapping and competency assessment of civil servants;
 organizing and developing a civil servant recruitment system;
 research and development in the field of personnel management;
 implementation of legal aid;
 providing education and training in the field of personnel management;
 fostering and administering administrative support to all organizational units within the NCSA; and
 supervision of the implementation of their duties.

Governance

Minister of State Apparatus Utilization and Bureaucratic Reform 
Minister of State Apparatus Utilization and Bureaucratic Reform is not part of the civil service as it is a political position.

Head of National Civil Service Agency 
Head of National Civil Service Agency is the highest civil servant in National Civil Service Agency.

 R.P. Soeroso (1948–1950)
 Marsono (1950–1960)
 Memed Tanumidjaja (1961–1965)
 Soedirjo (1965–1972)
 A.E. Manihuruk (1972–1987)
 Waskito Reksosudirdjo (1987–1994)
 Soenarko (1994–1999)
 Sofian Effendi (1999–2000)
 Prijono Tjipto Herijanto (2000–2002)
 Sunarti (2002)
 Hardijanto (2002–2004)
 Prapto Hadi (2005–2007)
 Edy Topo Ashari (2007–2012)
 Eko Sutrisno (2012–2015)
 Bima Haria Wibisana (2015–)

Organisation
The National Civil Service Agency consists of:
 Head
 Vice Head
 Main Secretariat
 Bureau of Planning and Organisation
 Bureau of Finance
 Bureau of Human Resources
 Bureau of General Affairs
 Bureau of Public Relation, Law, and Cooperation
 Deputy of Civil Service Management Guidance (
 Deputy of Civil Service Reposition
 Deputy of Civil Service Information System
 Deputy of Supervision and Control
 Inspectorate
 Center of Civil Servant Requirement Planning
 Center of Functional Civil Service Guidance
 Center of Selection System Development
 Center of Civil Servant Competence Assessment
 Center of Civil Service Development
 Center of Civil Service Management Research
 Center of Civil Service Legal Consultation and Assistance

References

External links
Official website
#ASNKiniBeda YouTube channel

Government agencies of Indonesia
Government agencies established in 1948